Norwell District Secondary School, formerly known as Palmerston High School, and often simply called Norwell or NDSS, is a mid-sized composite high school located in Palmerston, Ontario. The school serves an area of approximately 500 km², including the communities of Palmerston, Harriston, Drayton, Clifford, Moorefield, Rothsay, and for French Immersion, students from more distant towns such as Mount Forest. Most students (over 90%) are bused in.

Curriculum

Departments

 Art
 Business
 English
 Family Studies
 Geography
 Guidance/Career Studies
 History
 Languages
 Library
 Math
 Music
 Physical Education
 Science (and CELP)
 Special Education/Alternative Education
 Technology

Extracurricular activities and clubs 
Norwell District Secondary School’s athletic teams, formerly known as the Redmen, include badminton, basketball, cross country running, field hockey, ice hockey, rugby, soccer, track and field, and volleyball. The school hosts tournaments in ice hockey and volleyball, sports in which the school is competitive.

Norwell’s grade nine and eleven Hockey Skills Program and Integrated Arts Projects at Drayton Theatre, CELP, state of the art technical programming, new LEAF program, and achievement of becoming an ECO Gold School represent the foundation of a new way of building educational programs that are relevant to learning and to our learners. 

Cut the Mic, formerly known as Infrasonic, is an annual event at Norwell, usually held in April. Bands and musicians within the school perform for the community.

Norwell has held the Relay For Life since 2004 to fundraise for the Canadian Cancer Society. In the first five years of Relay For Life, the school has raised over $200,000 toward this cause.

See also
List of high schools in Ontario

References

External links 
 
 Norwell athletics adopts new team name
 palmerstonrailwaymuseum.ca

Educational institutions established in 1940
High schools in Wellington County, Ontario
1940 establishments in Ontario